CKRO-FM is a Canadian radio station, which broadcasts at 97.1 FM in the Pokemouche-Caraquet region of New Brunswick. The station airs a French language community radio format for the region's Acadian community.

This station received CRTC approval on July 20, 1987.

The station is a member of the Alliance des radios communautaires du Canada.

References

External links
www.ckro.ca - CKRO FM 97,1  La radio au coeur de la péninsule
 

KRO
KRO
KRO
Radio stations established in 1987
1987 establishments in New Brunswick